Sossenheim is a quarter of Frankfurt am Main, Germany.  It is part of the Ortsbezirk West and is subdivided into the Stadtbezirke Sossenheim-Ost and Sossenheim-West.

Sossenheim has been a district of Frankfurt since 1928 and makes part of the northwest border of the city. It borders Unterliederbach, Eschborn in the north, Rödelheim in the east and Griesheim and Nied in the south.

Painter Wilhelm Runze is buried in the Sossenheim Cemetery.

References

Districts of Frankfurt